Pachydermatous eosinophilic dermatitis is a skin condition observed in South African black teenage girls and characterized by generalized pruritic papules, hypertrophic genital lesions and peripheral eosinophilia.

See also 
 Keloid morphea
 List of cutaneous conditions

References 

Eosinophilic cutaneous conditions